The Edison Pioneers was an organization composed of former employees of Thomas Edison who had worked with the inventor in his early years. Membership was limited to people who had worked closely with Edison before 1885. 
On February 11, 1918, the Edison Pioneers met for the first time, on the 71st birthday of Edison. There were 37 people at the first meeting.
Edison himself was not present; it was announced he was "engaged in important government service".
It was suspected he was working on a military project since World War I was still in progress. The organization had 100 members although in later years descendants of Edison Pioneers were also allowed membership.

Members

Members of the Edison Pioneers:

 Edward Goodrich Acheson (1856–1931)
 William Symes Andrews (1847–1929)
 John I. Beggs (1847–1925)
 C. A. Benton
 Sigmund Bergmann
 Charles S. Bradley
 James Burke (1873–1940)* 
 Charles Lorenzo Clarke (1853-1941)
George V. Delany (died 1933)
 Charles L Edgar
 Charles L. Eidlitz (1866–1951), business executive
 William E. Gilmore
 Edwin T. Greenfield
 William Joseph Hammer
 John White Howell
 Samuel Insull (1859–1938)
 Francis Jehl
 Oscar Junggren 
 Alfred W Kiddle
 Isaac Krall 
 Lewis Howard Latimer
 Thomas Commerford Martin (1856–1924)
 George F. Morrison (1867–1943), Vice President of General Electric Company
 H. W. Nelson 
 Frederic Nicholls
 John G Ott
 Henry V.A. Parsell (1868-1962) 
 Charles E. Pattison 
 Charles R. Price
 Louis Rau
 Frederick Sargent
 Frederick A. Scheffler
 Elmer Ambrose Sperry (1860–1930)
 Francis Robbins Upton, first president
Theodore Vandeventer
 Montgomery Waddell
 Schuyler Skaats Wheeler
 Edwin R. Weeks
 Charles Wirt

References

External links
Image

 
Thomas Edison
Engineering societies based in the United States
History of engineering
Organizations established in 1918
1918 establishments in the United States